The 2009 Melbourne Vixens season saw Melbourne Vixens play in the 2009 ANZ Championship. With a team co-captained by Bianca Chatfield and Sharelle McMahon, Melbourne Vixens won 12 of their 13 matches during the regular season and finished as minor premiers. Vixens subsequently defeated Waikato Bay of Plenty Magic 58–43 in the major semi-final and Adelaide Thunderbirds 54–46 in the grand final to finish as overall premiers. Vixens hosted the grand final on Sunday 26 July at Hisense Arena.

Players

Transfers

2009 team

Pre-season
In March 2009, Melbourne Vixens played in the 2009 SOPA Cup, hosted by Netball New South Wales at the Sydney Olympic Park Sports Centre. Vixens finished third in the tournament behind New South Wales Swifts and Adelaide Thunderbirds.

Regular season
Melbourne Vixens won 12 of their 13 matches during the regular season. Their only defeat came in Round 10 against Waikato Bay of Plenty Magic, their main challengers for top spot. Vixens had to win their final two home matches with plenty of  goals to guarantee top place. After a 63–35 win against Canterbury Tactix in Round 13, Vixens' defeated Central Pulse 80–39 in Round 14 to secure the minor premiership.

Fixtures and results
Round 1
 
Round 2

Round 3
 
Round 4
 
Round 5

Round 6
Melbourne Vixens received a bye 
Round 7
 
Round 8

Round 9

Round 10

Round 11

Round 12
 
Round 13

Round 14

Final table

Playoffs

Major semi-final

Grand final

Award winners

Vixens awards

Australian Netball Awards

Gallery

References

2009 ANZ Championship season
2009